Nobel Industries can refer to:

Nobel Industries (Scotland) - A company established by Alfred Nobel in Scotland and merged into Imperial Chemical Industries in 1927
Nobel Industries (Sweden) - A company established by Alfred Nobel in Sweden merged into Akzo Nobel in 1994